Holston may refer to:

Holston, Virginia
Holston River
Holston Formation
Treaty of Holston
Holston Conference, an annual conference within Methodism
Holston Army Ammunition Plant in Kingsport, Tennessee
The Holston, an NRHP-listed high-rise in Knoxville, Tennessee

People with the surname
David Holston (born 1986), American basketball player
Mike Holston (born 1958), American football player